Kennedi Clements  (born January 21, 2007) is a Canadian child actress. She is best known for portraying Madison Bowen in the 2015 remake of Poltergeist and Noel in Jingle All the Way 2.

Early life
Kennedi is the eldest child of three. She resides in Chilliwack and performed as a dancer in Street Kings Academy of Dance (SK) and Project Dance Chilliwack (PDC).

Filmography

Film

Television

References

External links

2007 births
Canadian film actresses
Canadian child actresses
Living people
21st-century Canadian actresses
Canadian television actresses